Melshire Estates is a neighborhood in north Dallas, Texas (USA). It is generally bounded by Charlestown Drive (and the houses to the north facing it) on the north, Preston Road ( SH 289) on the east, Forest Lane on the south, and the Dallas North Tollway on the west.  Small areas adjacent to Forest Lane, a shopping center on the northwestern corner of Preston Road and Forest Lane, and townhomes along Lindenshire Lane and Brookstone Drive are not considered part of the neighborhood.

Education 
The neighborhood is served by the Dallas Independent School District. Children in the neighborhood attend Nathan Adams Elementary School, E. D. Walker Middle School, and W. T. White High School.

References

External links 
 Melshire Estates Homeowners Association
 Melshire Estates Real Estate and Area Info.